Paul Poux (born 9 July 1984 in Angoulême) is a French former professional road cyclist, who competed for  from 2011 to 2013.

When Sojasun folded after the 2013 season, Poux could not find a team for the 2014 season and ended his career.

Major results

2009
 1st Grand Prix du Pays d'Aix
2010
 1st Souvenir Louison-Bobet
 1st Stage 3 (ITT) Circuit des Ardennes
 5th Chrono Champenois
 9th Overall Tour du Gévaudan Languedoc-Roussillon
 10th Chrono des Herbiers
2011
 1st Stage 4 Tour de Bretagne
 5th Duo Normand
 8th Overall Tour du Poitou-Charentes
2012
 1st Overall Rhône-Alpes Isère Tour
1st Stage 1
 1st Prologue Boucles de la Mayenne

References

External links

1984 births
Living people
French male cyclists